The castra of Densuș was a fort in the Roman province of Dacia. It was built by a Dacian settlement which had been founded before the Roman conquest of Dacia in 106 AD and continued to exist under Roman rule. Neither the date of the erection of the fort, nor its abandonment by the Romans have been determined. Its ruins are situated in Densuș (Romania).

See also
List of castra

Notes

External links
Roman castra from Romania – Google Maps / Earth 

Roman legionary fortresses in Romania
Ancient history of Transylvania